Alexander Barinev (9 April 1952 – 27 February 2021) was a Russian ice hockey player. He played for SKA MVO Kalinin, Khimik Voskresensk, Kristall Saratov, HC Spartak Moscow, and VEU Feldkirch.

Honours

 IIHF European Junior Championships
  – 1971 (with Soviet Union U-19)
 Soviet Championship League
  – 1975–76 (with Spartak Moscow)
  – 1978–79, 1979–80 (with Spartak Moscow)
 Austrian Hockey League
  – 1981–82, 1982–83, 1983–84, 1989–90 (with VEU Feldkirch)

Team staff history
Ref.: 
 1984–1985:  VEU Feldkirch (player-coach)
 1989–1991:  VEU Feldkirch (head coach)
 1991–1994:  EC Ratingen (head coach)
 1994–1995:  EC Bad Tölz (head coach)
 1997–2000:  Spartak Moscow (asst. coach)
 2000–2001:  Vityaz Podolsk (head coach)
 2002–2005:  Spartak Moscow (asst. coach)
 2008–2009:  Spartak Moscow-2 (head coach)
 2009–2010:  MHK Spartak Moscow (head coach)

References

1952 births
2021 deaths
Russian ice hockey players
HC MVD players
Atlant Moscow Oblast players
Kristall Saratov players
HC Spartak Moscow players
VEU Feldkirch players